Krishna Prasad (died 2010), was a Fijian politician of Indian descent, who held the Nadi Open Constituency in the House of Representatives for the Fiji Labour Party in the parliamentary election of 2001.

Prasad retired from politics at the general election held on 6–13 May 2006. Prasad died from a heart attack on 27 April 2010.

References

Year of birth missing
2010 deaths
Fiji Labour Party politicians
Indian members of the House of Representatives (Fiji)
Politicians from Nadi
Fijian politicians of Indian descent